Þorláksson is a surname of Icelandic origin, meaning son of Þorlákur. In Icelandic names, the name is not strictly a surname, but a patronymic. The name refers to:
Árni Þorláksson (1237–1298), Icelandic Roman Catholic clergyman; Bishop of Iceland 1269–98
Guðbrandur Þorláksson (1541–1627), Icelandic mathematician and cartographer; Bishop of Hólar to 1627
Jón Þorláksson (1877–1935), Icelandic politician; Prime Minister of Iceland 1926–27
Þórarinn B. Þorláksson (1867–1924), Icelandic painter

Icelandic-language surnames